Meletius or Meletios may refer to:

Patriarchs of Alexandria
Meletius I of Alexandria, Saint and Patriarch from 1590 to 1601 (same as Meletius I of Constantinople)
Meletius II of Alexandria, Patriarch from 1926 to 1935 (same as Meletius IV of Constantinople)

Patriarchs of Constantinople
Meletius I of Alexandria, Saint and locum tenens of Constantinople (1597-1598) (Same as Meletius I of Alexandria)
Meletius II of Constantinople, patriarch in 1769
Meletius III of Constantinople, patriarch in 1845
Meletius IV of Constantinople, patriarch 1921-1923 (same as Meletius II of Alexandria)

Other people
Melitius of Lycopolis, bishop and founder of the Melitians
Meletius of Antioch, Saint and Patriarch from 360 to 381
Meletios the Younger (d. c. 1105), monk and pilgrim
Meletius II of Antioch, Patriarch from 1899 to 1906
Meletius of Jerusalem, Patriarch of Jerusalem from 1731 to 1737
Meletius Smotrytsky, Archbishop and proposed saint
Meletios Kalamaras, late Metropolitan of Nicopolis & Preveza